The Piave River 1809 order of battle shows the units and organization for the Franco-Italian and Austrian Empire armies that fought in the Battle of Piave River on 8 May 1809. Eugène de Beauharnais, the viceroy of the Kingdom of Italy defeated Archduke John of Austria. Eugène's Advance Guard crossed the river first and was assailed by Austrian cavalry and artillery. The French cavalry routed the opposing cavalry and captured 14 enemy guns. A lull followed as John arranged his infantry in a formidable defensive position. Meanwhile, Eugène struggled to pour reinforcements into the bridgehead as the Piave rose dangerously. In the afternoon, the viceroy sent Paul Grenier to drive back the Austrian left while Jacques MacDonald mounted an assault on the center. The attack succeeded in breaking the Austrian line and compelling John to order a retreat.

Franco-Italian Army

Army of Italy: Eugène de Beauharnais

Advance Guard and Reserve
 Artillery: General of Division Jean-Barthélemot Sorbier
 12-pound foot battery (8 guns)
 Advance Guard: General of Brigade Joseph Marie, Count Dessaix (4,980, 4 guns)
 Brigade: Colonel Nagle
 Converged Voltiguers (2,200)
 Brigade: Major Vautre
 Converged Voltiguers (2,100)
 Attached:
 9th Chasseurs à cheval (540)
 4-pound horse battery (4 guns)
 Division: General of Division Jean Mathieu Seras (7,500, 10 guns)
 1st Brigade:
 4th Battalion/35th Line Infantry Regiment
 53rd Line Infantry Regiment (4 battalions)
 2nd Brigade:
 79th Line Infantry Regiment (2 battalions)
 106th Line Infantry Regiment (3 battalions)
 Attached: 8-pound foot battery, 4-pound foot battery (12 guns)
 Italian Guard: General of Brigade Teodoro Lechi (2,580, 6 guns)
 Brigade:
 Italian Guard Velites Battalion
 Italian Honor Guard Squadron
 Brigade:
 Italian Guard Chasseurs Battalion
 Italian Guard Grenadiers Battalion
 Italian Guard Dragoon Regiment (2 squadrons)
 Attached: 6-pound horse battery (6 guns)

MacDonald's Corps
 
General of Division Jacques MacDonald (14,580, 24 guns)
 1st Division: General of Division Jean-Baptiste Broussier
 1st Brigade:
 9th Line Infantry Regiment (3 battalions)
 4th Battalion/11th Line Infantry Regiment
 2nd Brigade:
 84th Line Infantry Regiment (4 battalions)
 92nd Line Infantry Regiment (3 battalions)
 Attached: 8-pound foot battery, 4-pound foot battery (12 guns)
 2nd Division: General of Division Jean Maximilien Lamarque
 1st Brigade:
 18th Light Infantry Regiment (2 battalions)
 13th Line Infantry Regiment (4 battalions)
 2nd Brigade:
 23rd Line Infantry Regiment (2 battalions)
 29th Line Infantry Regiment (4 battalions)
 Attached: 8-pound foot battery, 4-pound foot battery (12 guns)

Grenier's Corps

General of Division Paul Grenier (16,800, 18 guns)
 1st Division: General of Brigade Louis Abbé
 1st Brigade:
 8th Light Infantry Regiment (2 battalions)
 1st Line Infantry Regiment (4 battalions)
 2nd Brigade:
 52nd Line Infantry Regiment (4 battalions)
 102nd Line Infantry Regiment (4 battalions)
 Napoleone Dragoon Regiment (1 squadron)
 Attached: 8-pound foot battery, 4-pound foot battery (12 guns)
 2nd Division: General of Division Pierre François Joseph Durutte
 1st Brigade:
 22nd Light Infantry Regiment (2 battalions)
 23rd Line Infantry Regiment (4 battalions)
 2nd Brigade:
 60th Line Infantry Regiment (2 battalions)
 62nd Line Infantry Regiment (2 battalions)
 Attached: 6-pound foot battery (6 guns)

Baraguey d'Hilliers' Corps

General of Division Louis Baraguey d'Hilliers (21,000, 18 guns)
 1st Division: General of Division Achille Fontanelli
 1st Brigade:
 1st Italian Line Infantry Regiment (3 battalions)
 2nd Italian Line Infantry Regiment (1 battalion)
 3rd Italian Line Infantry Regiment (3 battalions)
 2nd Brigade:
 7th Italian Line IR (2 battalions)
 Dalmatian Infantry Regiment (2 battalions)
 112th Line Infantry Regiment (3 battalions)
 Attached: 6-pound foot battery (6 guns)
 2nd Division: General of Division Jean-Baptiste Dominique Rusca (not present at Piave)
 1st Brigade:
 1st Italian Light Infantry Regiment (2 battalions)
 2nd Italian Light Infantry Regiment (2 battalions)
 4th Italian Line Infantry Regiment (2 battalions)
 2nd Brigade:
 67th Line Infantry Regiment (4 battalions)
 93rd Line Infantry Regiment (4 battalions)
 7th Dragoon Regiment (1 squadron)
 Attached: Two 6-pound foot batteries (12 guns)

Grouchy's Cavalry

General of Division Emmanuel Grouchy (7,500, 12 guns)
 Sahuc's Light Cavalry Division: General of Division Louis Michel Antoine Sahuc
 6th Chasseurs à cheval (4 squadrons)
 8th Chasseurs à cheval (4 squadrons)
 25th Chasseurs à cheval (4 squadrons)
 6th Hussars (4 squadrons)
 Attached: 4-pound horse battery (6 guns)
 Pully's Dragoon Division: General of Division Charles Randon de Pully
 23rd Dragoon Regiment (4 squadrons)
 28th Dragoon Regiment (4 squadrons)
 29th Dragoons (4 squadrons)
 Grouchy's Dragoon Division: General of Brigade François Guérin d'Etoquigny
 7th Dragoon Regiment (4 squadrons)
 30th Dragoon Regiment (4 squadrons)
 Reine Dragoon Regiment (4 squadrons)

Austrian Army

Army of Inner Austria: General der Kavallerie Archduke John of Austria

Cavalry and Advance Guard
 Artillery: General-Major Anton Reisner
 Two 12-pound position batteries (12 guns)
 Cavalry Division: Feldmarschall-Leutnant Christian Wolfskeel von Reichenberg 
 Brigade: General-Major Johann Hager von Altensteig
 Savoy Dragoon Regiment Nr. 5 (6 squadrons)
 Hohenlohe Dragoon Regiment Nr. 2 (6 squadrons)
 One and a half 6-pound cavalry batteries (9 guns)
 Unattached Cavalry:
 Archduke Josef Hussar Regiment Nr. 2 (2 squadrons)
 The following regiments were temporarily attached to Wolfskeel's division.
 Ott Hussar Regiment Nr. 5 (VIII Armeekorps)
 Frimont Hussar Regiment Nr. 9 (Advance Guard)

 Advance Guard: Feldmarschall-Leutnant Johann Maria Philipp Frimont (4,380, 16 guns)
 Brigade: General-Major Ignaz Splényi
 Archduke Franz Karl Infantry Regiment Nr. 52 (3 battalions)
 Oguliner Grenz Infantry Regiment Nr. 3 (2 battalions)
 Archduke Josef Hussar Regiment Nr. 2 (6 squadrons)
 Frimont Hussar Regiment Nr. 9 (7 squadrons)
 One-half Grenz 3-pound brigade battery (4 guns)
 Two 6-pound cavalry batteries (12 guns)

VIII Armeekorps
Feldmarschall-Leutnant Albert Gyulai (7,020, 12 guns)
 Colloredo's Brigade: General-Major Hieronymus Karl Graf von Colloredo-Mansfeld
 Strassoldo Infantry Regiment Nr. 27 (3 battalions)
 Saint Julien Infantry Regiment Nr. 61 (3 battalions)
 3-pound brigade battery (8 guns)
 Gajoli's Brigade: General-Major Anton Gajoli
 Franz Jellacic Infantry Regiment Nr. 62 (3 battalions)
 1st Banal Grenz Infantry Regiment Nr. 10 (2 battalions)
 One-half Grenz 3-pound brigade battery (4 guns)
 Detached Cavalry:
 Ott Hussar Regiment Nr. 5 (8 squadrons)

IX Armeekorps

Feldmarschall-Leutnant Ignaz Gyulai (12,720, 33 guns)
 Kalnássy's Brigade: General-Major Johann Kalnássy
 Reisky Infantry Regiment Nr. 13 (3 battalions)
 Simbschen Infantry Regiment Nr. 43 (3 battalions)
 3-pound brigade battery (8 guns)
 Marziani's Brigade: General-Major Franz Marziani
 Alvinczi Infantry Regiment Nr. 19 (3 battalions)
 3-pound brigade battery (8 guns)
 Gavasini's Brigade: General-Major Alois von Gavasini
 Ottocaner Grenz Infantry Regiment Nr. 2 (2 battalions)
 Kleinmayer's Brigade: General-Major Johann Peter Kleinmayer
 Szluiner Grenz Infantry Regiment Nr. 4 (2 battalions)
 3-pound brigade battery (8 guns)
 Salamon Grenadier Battalion
 Janusch Grenadier Battalion
 Mühlen Grenadier Battalion
 Chimani Grenadier Battalion
 Sebottendorf's Brigade: General-Major Ignaz Sebottendorf
 Graz Landwehr (3 battalions)
 Dumontet Freikorps Battalion

Notes

References
 Arnold, James R. Napoleon Conquers Austria. Westport, Conn.: Praeger Publishers, 1995. 
 Bowden, Scotty & Tarbox, Charlie. Armies on the Danube 1809. Arlington, Texas: Empire Games Press, 1980.
 Schneid, Frederick C. Napoleon's Italian Campaigns: 1805-1815. Westport, Conn.: Praeger Publishers, 2002. 
 Smith, Digby. The Napoleonic Wars Data Book. London: Greenhill, 1998. 

Napoleonic Wars orders of battle
Battles of the War of the Fifth Coalition